The Children of Llyr is a fantasy novel by American writer Evangeline Walton, the second in a series of four based on the Welsh Mabinogion. It was first published in paperback by Ballantine Books as the thirty-third volume of the Ballantine Adult Fantasy series in August, 1971. It has been reprinted a number of times since, and gathered together with Walton's other Mabinogion novels by Overlook Press as the omnibus The Mabinogion Tetralogy in 2002. The novel has also been published in translation in several European languages. The other three novels in the series are The Island of the Mighty (1936), The Song of Rhiannon (1972), and Prince of Annwn (1974).

The novel is a retelling of the story of the Second Branch of the Mabinogion, Branwen Ferch Llŷr (Branwen, Daughter of Llŷr).

Plot summary
Britain is ruled by the children of Llyr and Penarddun, the giant King Bran and his siblings Branwen and Manawyddan, together with their younger half-brothers Nissyen and Evnissyen, the offspring of Penarddun and Euroswydd. Branwen is given in marriage to Matholuch, king of Ireland. Angry that he was not consulted, Evnissyen, a tragic and haunted figure, insults Matholuch by mutilating his horses. Bran placates the Irish king by compensating him with new horses and treasure, including a magical cauldron which can restore the dead to life.

Back in Ireland, Matholuch and Branwen have a son, Gwern, but Evnissyen's insult continues to rankle the Irish and Branwen is banished to the kitchen and beaten every day. Finally she gets a message to Bran, who responds by making war on Matholuch. His army sails across the Irish Sea, but Bran is so huge he wades across. The fearful Matholuch offers peace and agrees to step aside as king of Ireland in favor of Gwern.

Matholwch builds a house big enough to entertain Bran. His followers, unrepentant, conceal themselves in the house inside a hanging hundred bags, supposedly containing flour. Evnissyen, suspecting treachery, reconnoitres the hall and kills the hidden warriors by crushing their heads inside the bags. Later, at the feast, the angry Evnissyen throws Gwern into the fire, precipitating a battle.

The fighting goes against Bran's forces, as the Irish use the magic cauldron to revive their dead. Evnissyen hides among the corpses to have himself thrown in the cauldron, which destroys it, although the effort costs him his life and comes too late for the combatants, almost all of whom are now dead. Only Branwen and seven of Bran's followers survive, notably Manawyddan and Pryderi, prince of Dyved. Bran himself is mortally wounded.

Bran instructs his mourning companions to cut off his head and take it back to Britain. Branwen dies on their return, grief-struck from the ruin caused on her account. Bran's head, magically preserved, continues to live for a time, comforting and entertaining his adherents in a series of enchanted feasts before burial. Of all the children of Llyr only Manawyddan remains.

External links
 

1971 American novels
American fantasy novels
Mabinogion Tetralogy
Works based on Celtic mythology
Ballantine Books books